Georges Tresallet (born 7 November 1937) is a French luger. He competed in the men's singles and doubles events at the 1968 Winter Olympics.

References

External links
 

1937 births
Living people
French male lugers
Olympic lugers of France
Lugers at the 1968 Winter Olympics
Sportspeople from Albertville